Zechariah, with many variant forms and spellings such as Zachariah and Zacharias, is a theophoric masculine given name of Hebrew origin, meaning "God remembers". It comes from the Hebrew word zakar, meaning to remember, and yah, one of the names of the God of Israel. Though Zechariah is the original transliteration of the name and used in the English translation of the Book of Zechariah, Zachariah, spelled with the letter A instead of the letter E, is more popular, with a common diminutive being Zach (also Zac, Zack, Zacki and Zak). Due to its religious significance, variants of the name exist in numerous languages, and it is also used as a monastic or papal name.

The Arabic form of the name, Zakariya, with spelling variants (Zakariyya, Zakaria, Zekaria), is dealt with on a separate dedicated page, Zakariya.

Variants

Albanian:(Zeqiri,Zekiri)
Arabic:  (Zakaria)
Aramaic (Syriac): ܙܟ݂ܲܪܝܵܐ (Zkharya)
Armenian: Զաքարիա (Zakʿaria)
Azerbaijani: Zəkəriyyə
Belarusian: Захар (Zachar)
Bengali: যাকারিয়া, জাকারিয়া (Zakariya, Jakariya)
Bulgarian: Захария (Zahari)
Bosnian: Zekerijah
Catalan: Zacaries
Chinese Simplified: 撒迦利亚 (Sājiālìyǎ)
Chinese Traditional: 撒迦利亞 (Sājiālìyǎ)
Czech: Zachariáš
Danish: Sakarias, Zacharias, Zakarias
English: Zachary, Zachery, Zachare, Zacharia, Zackary, Zackery, Zaqueri, Zechariah
Faroese: Sakarias, Sakaris, Sakir, Ziska
Filipino: Zacarias
Finnish: Sakari, Sakke, Saku
French: Zacharie
German: Zacharias
Georgian: ზაქარია (Zakaria, ZakCaria), ზაქრო (Zakro), შაქრო (Shakro)
Greek: Ζαχαρίας (Zacharias)
Hebrew:  (Zechariah, Zekharyah)
Hindi: ज़कारिया (Zaʾkāriyā)
Hungarian: Zakariás
Indonesian: Zakaria, Zakharia, Zakariya
Italian: Zaccaria
Japanese: ザカリア (Zakaria)
Kannada: ಜಚರಿಯ (Jacariya)
Korean: 즈카르야 (Jeukarya) or 스가랴 (Seugarya)
Kurdish: Zekerîya
Latin: Zacharias
Lithuanian: Zakaras, Zakarijas, Zacharijas, Zacharijus, Zakys
Macedonian: Захариј (Zaharij)
Malay: Zakaria
Malayalam (Kerala, India): Skaria, Scaria, Sakaria, Sakariah, Cherian, Kuncherian
Māori: Hakaraia
Persian:  (Zakariya, Zechariah, Zachariah)
Polish: Zachariasz
Portuguese: Zacarías
Punjabi: ਜ਼ਕਰਯਾਹ (Zakarayāha)
Romanian: Zaharia
Russian: Захарий (Zakhariy), Захария (Zakhariya), Захар (Zakhar)
Scottish Gaelic: Sachairi, Sagairi, Sagaire
Serbian: Захарије (Zaharije), Захарија (Zaharija), Зарија (Zarija), Зарије (Zarije)
Slovak: Zachariáš 
Slovenian: Zaharija
Somali: Sakariye, Sekaryaah
Spanish: Zacarías
Sindhi:  (Zaʾkāriyā)
Swahili: Zakaria
Swedish: Sakarias, Zacharias, Zakarias
Tamil: ஜக்கரியா (Jakkariyā)
Thai: ซาคาเรีย (Sākhāreīy)
Turkish: Zekeriya, Zekeriyya
Ukrainian: Захар (Zakhar), Захарій (Zakhariy), Захарія (Zakhariya)
Urdu:  (Zakaryyah)
Yiddish: זכריה

People
The list includes people with the monastic or papal name Zacharias or Zachariah.

For people with the Arabic variants of this name, see Zakariya (includes the variants Zakariyya, Zakaria, Zekaria).

Biblical
Zechariah (Hebrew prophet), a prophet of the kingdom of Judah
Zechariah (New Testament figure), the father of John the Baptist, also mentioned in the Quran as Zakariya
Minor Bible characters
Zechariah (list of biblical figures)#Minor characters lists several minor figures
Zechariah ben Jehoiada, son of the High Priest from the times of Ahaziah and Joash, martyred by the latter
Zechariah of Israel, king of Israel (reigned for 6 months in c. 752 BCE), son of Jeroboam

Orthodox saints, venerables, martyrs
Venerable Martyr Zacharias, by drowning in the sea, Orthodox saint and hosiomartyr commemorated on 21 October
Zacharias the Martyr, by drowning in the sea, Orthodox martyr, commemorated on October 22nd (either same as, or different from, saint commemorated on 21 October)
Zachariah (d. 724), one of the 63 Martyrs of Jerusalem, Orthodox saint and martyr commemorated on October 21st
Venerable Zachariah the Recluse of Egypt, Orthodox saint commemorated on 24 March
Venerable Zachariah, Faster of the Kiev Caves (12th century), Orthodox saint commemorated on 24 March
New Martyr Zachariah of Patrai in Morea (d. 1782)

Antiquity through early modern period
In chronological order:
Zacharias of Vienne (died 106), Bishop of Vienne
Zacharias Rhetor or Scholasticus (c. 465-after 536), bishop of Mytilene and author of the Historia Ecclesiastica
Zacharias of Jerusalem ( 609–632), patriarch of Jerusalem, Orthodox saint
Pope Zachary (679–752), also known as Zacharias (Gr., Lat.), the last Greek bishop of Rome (741–752)
Zacharias I of Makuria (c. 722), Nubian ruler
Zachariah (Khazar), 9th-century Khagan of the Khazars known to have ruled c. 861
Zacharias I of Makuria ( 722), Nubian king
Zacharias III of Makuria (c. 822-c. 854), Nubian ruler
Zachariah (Khazar), 9th century khagan of the Khazars known to have ruled c. 861
Zacharias I of Armenia (died 876), Catholicos of the Armenian Apostolic Church
Pope Zacharias of Alexandria (1004–1032), Coptic pope
Zacharias Chrysopolitanus (died  1155), Greek scholar
Zacharias Ferreri (1479–1524), Italian monk and papal legate
Zacharias Calliergi ( 1499–1515), Greek Renaissance humanist and scholar
Zacharias Ursinus (1534–1583), German theologian
Zacharias Stopius (born  1535), Latvian astronomer
Zacharias Dolendo (1561–1601), Dutch engraver
Zacharias Heyns (1566–1630), Dutch printer and engraver
Zacharias Paulusz ( 1580–1648), Dutch Golden Age portrait painter
Zacharias Janssen (1585– 1632), Dutch scientist
Zacharias Traber (1611–1678), Austrian physician
Zacharias Wagenaer (1614–1668), German governor
Zacharias Blyhooft ( 1630–1681), Dutch painter
Zacharias Longuelune (1669–1748), French architect
Zacharias Allewelt (1682–1744), Danish-Norwegian sea captain
Zacharias Conrad von Uffenbach (1683–1734), German book collector
Zacharias Hildebrandt (1688–1757), German organ builder

Single name (modern)

Zacharia, pen name of Paul Zacharia (born 1945), Indian writer of Malayalam literature
Zachariah or Zachariah Selwyn (born 1975), American singer-songwriter, actor, and writer
Zacarias, stage name of Brazilian comedian Mauro Faccio Gonçalves, cast member of comedy series Os Trapalhões
Zacarías (el Perico), performing name of Mexican professional wrestler Mini Máximo (born 1989)
Zacharias (klepht), (1759–1804), Greek klepht
Zakarias, pen-name of Finnish writer Adéle Weman (1844-1936)

Late modern and contemporary (born after 1750)
Arranged by order of the last name.
Zacharias Adoni (born 1999), Cypriot footballer
Zacharias Aprem (born 1966), Indian bishop
Zacharias Athanasios (1909–1977), Syro-Malankara Catholic bishop
Zacharias Barbitsiotis (1759–1804), Greek revolutionary
Zaqueri Black (born 1992), a.k.a. Aphromoo, e-Sports support
Zackery Bowen (died 2006), whose murder of Adriane "Addie" Hall and subsequent suicide are prominently featured in Ethan Brown's 2009 book Shake the Devil Off: A True Story of the Murder that Rocked New Orleans
Zacharias Chaliabalias (1946–2020), Greek footballer
Zacharias Charalambous (born 1971), Cypriot footballer
Zacarías Colque (born 1967), Bolivian politician
Zacharias Dase (1824–1861), German mental calculator
Zacharias "Zack" de la Rocha (born 1970), American singer-songwriter and activist; vocalist of Rage Against the Machine
Zecharias Frankel, (1801–1875), Bohemian-German rabbi and historian
Zacharias Hackzell (1751–1804), Swedish chief of police
Zacharias Heinesen (born 1936), Danish painter
Zacharias Jimenez (1947–2018), Filipino Roman Catholic bishop
Zacharias Kavousakis (born 1989), Greek footballer
Zacharias Kunuk (born 1957), Canadian Inuk producer and director
Zacharias Lewala ( 1908), Namibian miner
Zacharias Richard Mahabane (1881–1971), South African politician
Zachariah Keodirelang Matthews (1901–1968), Tswana South African anthropologist 
Zacarias Moussaoui (born 1968), French-Moroccan man convicted of participation in the September 11 attacks
Zacharias Mellebye (1781–1854), Norwegian politician
Zacharias Papantoniou (1877–1940), Greek writer and journalist
Zechariah Puoric Matuong, South Sudanese politician
Zecharia Sitchin (1920–2010), American author promoting the ancient astronaut theory
Zachary Taylor (1784–1850), 12th president of the United States (1849–1850)
Zacharias Theodorou (born 1993), Cypriot footballer
Zacharias Topelius (1818–1898), Finland-Swedish author
Zacharias Werner (1768–1823), German poet and priest

Fictional characters
Brother Zachariah, the name taken on by James Carstairs in the series The Infernal Devices and The Mortal Instruments
Zachariah (Supernatural), an angel in the American TV series Supernatural
Zacharias Smith in the Harry Potter series
Zachory Taylor in The Secret Life of Bees
Zack (Zacharias) Lane in the novel Zack by William Bell

See also

Zechariah (disambiguation)
Zacharias (surname)
Zachary, a male given name
Zakariya, the Arabic form of the name
Zack (personal name)
Zak (given name)
Zachary
Zach (disambiguation)
Zack (disambiguation)
Zahari (name)

References

Hebrew masculine given names
English masculine given names